Jairo Alonso Cano Salas Atehortúa (born June 2, 1984 in Amagá, Antioquia) is a Colombian professional road racing cyclist, who last rode for UCI Continental team .

Major results

2005
 1st Stage 1 Clásico RCN
2006
 Vuelta a Guatemala
1st Points classification
1st Stages 3, 10 & 12
2007
 1st Stage 5 Vuelta a Antioquia
 1st Stage 3 Vuelta a Guatemala
2008
 1st Stage 1 Vuelta al Valle del Cauca
 1st Stage 1 Clasica Marinilla
 1st Stage 5 Clásica Nacional Marco Fidel Suárez
 1st Stage 13 Vuelta a Guatemala
2011
 1st Stage 12 Vuelta a Colombia
2013
 1st  Sprints classification Vuelta a Colombia
2014
 1st Stage 11 Vuelta a Colombia
2016
 1st Stage 9 Vuelta a Colombia
2017
 1st Stage 1 (TTT) Vuelta a Colombia

References

External links

 

1984 births
Living people
Colombian male cyclists
Sportspeople from Antioquia Department